The Ford Prodigy was a low emission vehicle 72 mpg-US (3.3 L/100 km; 86 mpg-imp) diesel-hybrid concept car built in 2000 by Ford and aimed at establishing U.S. leadership in the development of extremely fuel-efficient (up to ) vehicles while retaining the features that make them marketable and affordable. It was introduced at the North American International Auto Show, as part of the Partnership for a New Generation of Vehicles with the rest of the 'Big Three' automobile manufacturers and the US Government.

References 

https://carbuzz.com/features/futuristic-concept-cars-that-belong-in-the-past

https://www.hotcars.com/from-ford-to-ferraris-you-need-to-check-out-the-sarasota-classic-car-museum/

Prodigy